Vistula Historic District is a designated historic district in the city of Toledo, Ohio, USA, listed on the National Register of Historic Places. The district comprises Toledo's oldest neighborhood and encompasses an area roughly bounded by Champlain, Summit, Walnut and Magnolia streets.

Vistula was a village established on land in what was then part of Michigan Territory, purchased in 1832 by Benjamin F. Stickney, in company with several investors from Lockport, New York, including Edward Bissell. In January 1833, Stickney platted the village of Vistula.

Another settlement, named Port Lawrence, had first been established in 1817, although the companies arranging sales of the land failed and nothing much was developed until a new plat was recorded for the village in 1833. This area encompassed roughly east to west from Jefferson to Washington Street and north to south, from Superior Street to the River, or slightly farther upstream from where the Vistula settlement would later be established.

When Vistula and Port Lawrence merged to form the city of Toledo in 1837, the area which had been contested between Michigan and Ohio in the Toledo War was granted to Ohio by the United States Congress.

References

External links 
 Michigan Department of Military and Veterans Affairs article
 Toledo's Historic Vistula Foundation, Inc.

History of Toledo, Ohio
National Register of Historic Places in Lucas County, Ohio
Historic districts on the National Register of Historic Places in Ohio
Neighborhoods in Toledo, Ohio
1978 establishments in Ohio